Vatnaöldur is the name of a series of craters in the Suðurland region of Iceland. They are  located in the Highlands of Iceland, northwest of the Veiðivötn and northeast of Landmannalaugar, within the municipality of Rangárþing ytra. It is part of the East volcanic zone (EVZ).

The craters were formed during a series of eruptions in the volcanic system of the Bárðarbunga around the year 870. The mainly explosive eruptions emitted  of tholeiite basalt.

See also
 List of volcanic eruptions in Iceland
 Volcanism of Iceland
 Geology of Iceland
 List of volcanoes in Iceland
 Geological deformation of Iceland

References

Sources 
 G. Larsen, Thor Thordarson: Phreatomagmatism in the Eastern Volcanic Zone; Retrieved July 25, 2010
 Commentary by volcanologist Haraldur Sigurðsson on Bárðarbunga and Vatnaöldur eruptions (Icelandic)
 Vatnaöldur. The Global Volcanism Program of the Smithsonian Institution
 Vulkanology by Haraldur Sigurðsson on Bárðarbunga and Vatnaöldur Eruptions (Isländish)
 Faculty of Earth Sciences - University of Iceland 2013.  Gravity studies of the structure of the Vatnaöldur and Veiðivötn crater rows, South Central Iceland. Jeanne M. Giniaux

Bárðarbunga
Central volcanoes of Iceland
East Volcanic Zone of Iceland
VEI-5 volcanoes
Volcanic systems of Iceland